The ASNOM memorial center is a building located in the village of Pelince, in the northern part of Macedonia.

It was built in 2004 and is a copy of the original building where the first plenary session of the Anti-Fascist Assembly for the People's Liberation of Macedonia (ASNOM) was held, which is located in the Prohor Pčinjski monastery in neighboring Serbia, two kilometers from the memorial center.

It is therefore a building with great historical importance for the Macedonian citizens and the country. Every year the Day of the Republic is celebrated here by thousands of people and the president or the prime minister of Macedonia being guests and holding speeches. Next to the building a library, a typical Macedonian restaurant and a park were constructed.

Gallery

References

World War II monuments and memorials in North Macedonia
Staro Nagoričane Municipality
Yugoslav World War II monuments and memorials